Morfin or Morfín is a surname. Notable people with the surname include:

 Carlos Morfín (born 1949), Mexican water polo player
 Jesús Flores Morfín (born 1953), Mexican politician
 José González Morfin (born 1954), Mexican politician and lawyer
 Lorenza Morfín (born 1982), Mexican road cyclist

Fictional characters
 Morfin Gaunt, a Harry Potter character
 Mr Morfin, in Dombey and Son